Urechidae (commonly known as "fat innkeeper" or "penis fish") is a family of spoonworms in the subclass Echiura. The only genus in the family is Urechis, which has four species.

Species
The World Register of Marine Species includes these species in this genus:-
Urechis caupo Fisher & MacGinitie, 1928
Urechis chilensis (M. Müller, 1852)
Urechis novaezealandiae (Dendy, 1898)
Urechis unicinctus (Drasche, 1880)

References

Echiurans
Annelid families